Bar Madan may refer to:
 Bar Madan Olya
 Bar Madan Sofla